The New Caledonia national football team is the national team of New Caledonia and is controlled by the Fédération Calédonienne de Football. Although they were only admitted to FIFA in 2004, they have been participating in the OFC Nations Cup since its inception. They have been one of this relatively small region's strongest teams, finishing second in 2008 and 2012, and third in 1973 and 1980. They were the top ranked OFC nation at number 95 in September 2008, making them only the fourth country from the confederation to have reached the global top 100.

History

The New Caledonian Football Federation, although created in 1928, did not join FIFA or the OFC until 2004, becoming the 205th member of the former.

Previously the New Caledonian selection, due to the attachment of local institutions to the French Football Federation, could only line up during friendly matches or regional competitions, such as the Pacific Games, as well as the Oceania Football Cup, but only as a guest.

The Cagous distinguished themselves during these competitions, winning the Pacific Games on several occasions, and finishing in third place, during the first two editions of the Oceania Cup.

After failing to qualify for the 2004 OFC Nations Cup, the New Caledonian Football Federation hired Didier Chambaron as the team's new coach. During the 2007 South Pacific Games in Apia, the Cagous were placed in group A and won over their great rival Tahiti (1–0), this meeting was the first of the playoffs for the 2010 FIFA World Cup. They then won against Tuvalu and the Cook Islands (1–0) and (3–0). For their last group match, they draw against Fiji (1–1). The New Caledonians finished second in their group, and then beat the Solomon Islands (3–2), then in the final won the trophy against Fiji (1–0).

The Pacific Games football tournament serving as the first qualifying round for the World Cup in South Africa, the team found themselves qualified for the second round, where New Zealand blocked their way by taking first place. The Cagous however finish second in front of Fiji and Vanuatu.

In May 2011, the selection faced Reunion twice in Nouméa, matches counting for the preparation of the games of the islands of the Indian Ocean in the Seychelles of the Reunionese. The New Caledonians lost both matches. However, a few months later, during the 2011 Pacific Games, New Caledonia won in the final against the Solomon Islands, with the score of (2–0), after a victory against Tahiti (3–1).

In June 2012, on the occasion of the Oceania Nations Cup, the Cagous succeeded in beating New Zealand in the semi-finals, with a score of 2–0 (goals from Bertrand Kai and Georges Gope-Fenepej), but failed in the final against their Tahitian rivals (1–0). Nevertheless, the competition serving as a second qualifying round for the 2014 FIFA World Cup, New Caledonia found itself, along with Tahiti and the semi-finalists New Zealand and the Solomon Islands qualified for the next round.

Rivalries

A historical sporting rivalry exists between the two French Pacific overseas collectivities, New Caledonia and Tahiti. They compete regularly in regional and, since 2006, international competitions. In 2012, Tahiti led the number of titles won (1 Oceania Nations Cup, 5 gold medals at the South Pacific Games, 2 at the South Pacific mini-games, against 6 gold at the South Pacific Games for New Caledonia. As of their last match in 2018, out of the 62 matches played since 1953, the New Caledonia has 28 wins against 25 for Tahiti and 9 draws.

Kit
Givova are the current kit provider for the national team since 2022. As of 2012, the national team's home kit is a grey jersey with red shorts and red socks. The away kit is a red jersey with red shorts and white socks.

Results and fixtures
For all past match results of the national team, see the team's 1951–99 and 2000–present results pages.

In March 2022, New Caledonia played their first matches since they took part in the 2019 Pacific Games.

2022

2023

Coaching history

 Guy Elmour (1971–1973)
 Jules Hmeune (1977)
 Rudi Gutendorf (1981)
 Jacques Zimako (1995)
 Michel Clarque (2002)
 Serge Martinengo de Novack (2002–2004)
 Didier Chambaron (2007–2010)
 Christophe Coursimault (2010–2012)
 Alain Moizan (2012–2015)
 Thierry Sardo (2015–2021)
 Dominique Wacalie (2021–present)

Current squad
The following players were called up for the FIFA World Cup qualification matches in March 2022.

Caps and goals updated as of 24 March 2022 after the game against New Zealand.

Player records

Players in bold are still active with New Caledonia.

Most capped players

Top goalscorers

Competitive record

FIFA World Cup

OFC Nations Cup

Pacific Games

Coupe de l'Outre Mer
2008 – Group stage
2010 – Group stage

Head-to-head record
Up to matches played on 21 September 2022.

References

External links
 New Caledonian Football Federation

 
Oceanian national association football teams
National football teams of Overseas France